Gene Johnson (born March 11, 1941) is a retired male high jumper from the United States, who competed in the 1960s for his native country. He set his personal best in the men's high jump event on January 29, 1966, at an indoor meet in Portland.

Achievements

References

Profile

1941 births
Living people
American male high jumpers
Athletes (track and field) at the 1963 Pan American Games
Pan American Games medalists in athletics (track and field)
Pan American Games gold medalists for the United States
Medalists at the 1963 Pan American Games